Spellbrook is a hamlet in Hertfordshire, situated between Bishop's Stortford and Sawbridgeworth.

Location
Spellbrook is one mile south of Bishop's Stortford, thirteen miles east of Hertford and ten miles north of Epping. It lies on the A1184 The river Stort flows through the east of the town, past the Three Horseshoes public house. It has a school, Spellbrook Primary

Nearby towns and cities: Bishop's Stortford, Sawbridgeworth

Nearby villages: Trimms Green, Allen's Green, Little Hallingbury

Politics and local government
Spellbrook is administered by East Hertfordshire district council.

Sawbridgeworth Town Council also covers Spellbrook.

References

Hamlets in Hertfordshire
Sawbridgeworth